National Ecological Observatory Network (NEON) is a large facility program operated by Battelle Memorial Institute and funded by the National Science Foundation. In full operation since 2019, NEON gathers and provides long-term, standardized data on ecological responses of the biosphere to changes in land use and climate, and on feedback with the geosphere, hydrosphere, and atmosphere. NEON is a continental-scale research platform for understanding how and why our ecosystems are changing.

Vision and mission

The vision for NEON is to guide global understanding and decisions in a changing environment with scientific information about continental-scale ecology  through integrated observations, experiments and forecasts. NEON's mission is to design, implement and operate the first and foremost integrated continental‐scale scientific infrastructure to enable research, discovery and education about ecological change.

NEON collects ecological and climatic observations across the continental United States, including Alaska, Hawaii and Puerto Rico. The observatory is among the first to detect and enable forecasting of ecological change at continental scales over multiple decades. NEON has partitioned the United States into 20 ecoclimatic domains, each of which represents different regions of vegetation, landforms, climate, and ecosystem performance. Data is collected by field technicians and passive sensors at strategically selected sites within each domain and synthesized into information products that can be used to describe changes in the nation's ecosystem through space and time. NEON data products are freely available via a web portal.

Purpose and function

Science

The data NEON collects are defined by a series of Grand Challenges, as identified by the National Research Council at the request of the National Science Foundation. The National Research Council established a committee to evaluate the major ecological, environmental, and national concerns that require a continental-scale observatory, and it identified the following Environmental Grand Challenges:
 Biogeochemistry: The study of how chemical, physical, geological, and biological processes combine to create the natural environment.
 Biodiversity: The full range of life forms on earth, or in a particular region.
 Climate change: A significant long-term change in the kind of weather we would expect based on averages calculated from climate data.
 Ecohydrology: The study of how organisms interact with their environment and with the constant movement of water.
 Infectious Diseases: Diseases spread by viruses, parasites, and bacteria that are sometimes transmitted to people by animals, birds, and insects.
 Land Use: The many ways that people change the natural landscape and environment, such as by building cities, cutting down forests, or planting crops.
 Invasive Species: Plants and organisms that overpopulate a particular place, or species that move into areas they haven’t lived in before.

Thus, the data and observations that NEON collects focuses on how land use, climate change and invasive species affect biodiversity, disease ecology, and ecosystem services.  Obtaining integrated data on these relationships over a long-term period is crucial to improving forecast models and resource management for environmental change.

The National Science Foundation's vision for NEON is described as:
"A continental scale research instrument consisting of geographically distributed infrastructure, networked via state-of-the-art communications. Cutting-edge lab and field instrumentation, site-based experimental infrastructure, natural history archive facilities and/or computational, analytical and modeling capabilities, linked via a computational network will comprise NEON. NEON will transform ecological research by enabling studies on major environmental challenges at regional to continental scales. Scientists and engineers will use NEON to conduct real-time ecological studies spanning all levels of biological organization and temporal and geographical scales. NSF disciplinary and multi-disciplinary programs will support NEON research projects and educational activities. Data from standard measurements made using NEON will be publicly available.” (NSF 04549, 2004)

NEON is specifically designed to address central scientific questions about the interactions of ecosystems, climate, and land use:
 How will ecosystems and their components respond to changes in natural- and human-induced forcings such as climate, land use, and invasive species across a range of spatial and temporal scales? And, what is the pace and pattern of the responses?
 How do the internal responses and feedbacks of biogeochemistry, biodiversity, hydroecology, and biotic structure and function interact with changes in climate, land use, and invasive species? And, how do these feedbacks vary with ecological context and spatial and temporal scales?

Education
The data and information products that NEON collects and provides is readily available to scientists, educators, students, decision makers and the public to use to understand and address ecological questions and issues. Data is provided as meaningful information and learning tools that engage many audiences, including members of underserved communities, and promote broad ecological literacy.

History
NEON was initially conceived in 2000, with a preliminary plan being developed in 2006. The National Science Foundation, the National Science Board and Congress approved funding for NEON in 2011.

Beginning in 2011, NEON, Inc., the entity in charge of initially running the NEON project, was audited by the Defense Contract Audit Agency on behalf of the National Science Foundation Office of the Inspector General.  Auditor-in-Charge J. Kirk McGill determined that NEON, Inc. had poor control over taxpayer funds and could easily go over budget with little or no warning. He also found that NEON, Inc. had spent taxpayer funds on illegal expenditures including alcohol, lobbying, parties, and luxury travel.  When McGill's findings were not addressed by senior DCAA management, he disclosed the matter directly to Congress.

On December 3, 2014 a hearing on the matter was held before the United States House Committee on Science, Space and Technology.  A second hearing was held on February 3, 2015.  In April 2015 the Office of Management and Budget ordered all departments and agencies not to use "management fees" to pay for illegal expenditures.  On September 18, 2015, a third hearing was held. The Committee ultimately substantiated McGill's allegations towards NEON, Inc. and on December 11, 2015, NEON, Inc. was fired from the project.  This represents one of the largest Federal agreement terminations for cause in history. The NSF chose Battelle in March 2016 to complete the construction of the Observatory in place of NEON, Inc.

The program was fully operational in 2019.

Layout

NEON has categorized five types of measurement systems: the Airborne Observation Platform (AOP), Aquatic Instrument System (AIS), Aquatic Observation System (AOS), Terrestrial Instrument System (TIS), and Terrestrial Observation System (TOS).

Airborne observations
NEON takes airborne photography and performs aerial LiDAR observations of the sites being studied. This is accomplished by slow flying aircraft surveying at 1,000 meters above the ground.

Aquatic sites 
Aquatic site sampling depends on the type of environment, varying between streams, rivers, and lakes. Automated sensors assess water quality and depth and manual observations study organisms, biogeochemistry, hydrology, and morphology.

Terrestrial sites
Each terrestrial site studied by NEON includes 30 randomly distributed plots. At select plots, technicians monitor soil biogeochemistry and microbes; plant diversity, biogeochemistry, biomass, productivity, and leaf area index; beetle diversity; mosquito prevalence, diversity, phenology, and infectious disease; small mammal diversity, demography, and disease; avian diversity; and tick‐borne diseases.

Each terrestrial site is outfitted with soil sensor arrays and a tower mounted with sensory equipment. Towers are built to extend above the vegetation canopy and take measurements such as on air quality, carbon dioxide flux, temperature, and atmospheric pressure. Additional sampling plots are located within the airshed of the tower.

Locations

Sites are organized within 20 separate ecoclimatic domains throughout the United States. They are divided by terrestrial and aquatic sampling. 
Domain 1 encompasses the Northeast region and contains one aquatic and two terrestrial sites. The office is located in Fitchburg, Massachusetts.
Lower Hop Brook, a tributary of Quabbin Reservoir, Massachusetts
Harvard Forest, Massachusetts
Bartlett Experimental Forest, White Mountain National Forest, New Hampshire
Domain 2 encompasses the Mid-Atlantic region and contains two aquatic and three terrestrial sites. The office is located in Front Royal, Virginia.
Posey Creek, Virginia
Lewis Run, Virginia
Blandy Experimental Farm, Virginia
Smithsonian Conservation Biology Institute, Virginia
Smithsonian Environmental Research Center, Maryland
Domain 3 encompasses the Southeast region and contains three aquatic and three terrestrial sites. The office is located in Gainesville, Florida.
Lake Barco, Florida
Suggs Lake, Florida
Flint River, Georgia
Ordway-Swisher Biological Station, Florida
Disney Wilderness Preserve, Florida
Joseph W. Jones Ecological Research Center, Georgia 
Domain 4 studies the Atlantic neotropical region and contains two aquatic and two terrestrial sites. The office is located in Guanica, Puerto Rico.
Río Cupeyes, Puerto Rico
Río Guilarte, Puerto Rico
Lajas Experimental Station, Lajas Research and Development Center, Puerto Rico
Guanica Forest, Puerto Rico
Domain 5 studies the Great Lakes region and contains two aquatic and three terrestrial sites. The office is located in Land O' Lakes, Wisconsin.
Little Rock Lake, Wisconsin
Crampton Lake, Wisconsin
Treehaven, University of Wisconsin-Stevens Point, Wisconsin
Steigerwaldt Land Services, Park Falls District of the Chequamegon-Nicolet National Forest, Wisconsin
University of Notre Dame Environmental Research Center, Michigan
Domain 6 encompasses the Prairie Peninsula and contains two aquatic and three terrestrial sites. The office is located in Manhattan, Kansas.
McDiffett Creek, Kansas
Kings Creek, Kansas
Konza Prairie Biological Station, Kansas (two sites)
The University of Kansas Field Station, Kansas
Domain 7 encompasses the Appalachian Mountains and Cumberland Plateau and contains two aquatic and three terrestrial sites. The office is located in Oak Ridge, Tennessee.
LeConte Creek, Tennessee
Walker Branch, Tennessee
Mountain Lake Biological Station, University of Virginia, Virginia
Twin Creeks, Great Smoky Mountains National Park, Tennessee
Oak Ridge National Laboratory, Tennessee
Domain 8 encompasses the Ozark region and contains three aquatic and three terrestrial sites. The office is located in Tuscaloosa, Alabama.
Black Warrior River, Alabama
Mayfield Creek, Alabama
Tombigbee River, Choctaw National Wildlife Refuge, Alabama
Dead Lake, Demopolis, Alabama
Lenoir Landing, Choctaw National Wildlife Refuge, Alabama
Talladega National Forest, Alabama
Domain 9 encompasses the Northern plains region and contains two aquatic and three terrestrial sites. The office is located in Jamestown, North Dakota.
Prairie Lake, North Dakota
Prairie Pothole, North Dakota
Dakota Coteau Field School, Chase Lake National Wildlife Refuge, North Dakota
Woodworth Study Area, Chase Lake National Wildlife Refuge, North Dakota
Northern Great Plains Research Laboratory, North Dakota
Domain 10 encompasses the Central plains region and contains one aquatic and three terrestrial sites. The office is located in Boulder, Colorado.
Arikaree River, Fox Ranch Preserve, Colorado
Rocky Mountain National Park, Colorado
North Sterling, Colorado
Central Plains Experimental Range, Pawnee National Grasslands, Colorado
Domain 11 encompasses the Southern plains region and contains one aquatic and three terrestrial sites. The office is located in Denton, Texas.
Blue River, Oka' Yanahli Preserve, Oklahoma
Pringle Creek, Texas
Marvin Klemme Range Research Station, Oklahoma State University, Oklahoma
Lyndon B. Johnson National Grassland, Texas
Domain 12 encompasses the Northern Rocky Mountains and contains one aquatic and one terrestrial site. The office is located in Bozeman, Montana.
Blacktail Deer Creek, Yellowstone National Park, Wyoming
Yellowstone Northern Range (Frog Rock), Yellowstone National Park, Wyoming
Domain 13 encompasses the Southern Rocky Mountains and Colorado Plateau and contains two aquatic and two terrestrial sites. The office is located in Boulder, Colorado.
Como Creek, Colorado
West St. Louis Creek, Colorado
Moab, Utah
Niwot Ridge Mountain Research Station, Colorado
Domain 14 encompasses the Desert Southwest and contains one aquatic and two terrestrial sites. The office is located in Tucson, Arizona.
Sycamore Creek, Arizona
Jornada Experimental Range, New Mexico
Santa Rita Experimental Range, Arizona
Domain 15 encompasses the Great Basin and contains one aquatic and one terrestrial site. The office is located in South Salt Lake, Utah.
Red Butte Creek, Utah
Onaqui Mountains, Utah
Domain 16 encompasses the Pacific Northwest and contains two aquatic and two terrestrial sites. The office is located in Vancouver, Washington.
McRae Creek, H.J. Andrews Experimental Forest, Oregon
Martha Creek, Washington
Wind River Experimental Forest, Washington
Abby Road, Yacolt Burn State Forest, Washington
Domain 17 studies the Pacific Southwest and contains two aquatic and two terrestrial sites. The office is located in Fresno, California.
Upper Big Creek, California
Teakettle Creek, California
San Joaquin Experimental Range, California
Lower Teakettle, Sierra National Forest, California
Soaproot Saddle, Sierra National Forest, California
Domain 18 studies the tundra and contains one aquatic and two terrestrial sites. The office is located in Fairbanks, Alaska.
Oksrukuyik Creek, Alaska
Toolik Field Station, Alaska
Utqiaġvik, Alaska
Domain 19 studies the taiga and contains one aquatic and three terrestrial sites. The office is located in Fairbanks, Alaska.
Caribou Creek, Alaska
Caribou-Poker Creeks Research Watershed, Alaska
Delta Junction, Alaska
Healy, Alaska
Domain 20 studies the Pacific tropical region and contains one terrestrial site. The office is located in Hilo, Hawaii.
Pu'u Maka'ala Natural Area Reserve, Hawaii

See also
Global Lake Ecological Observatory Network
Long-Term Agroecosystem Research Network
Long Term Ecological Research Network

References
Relevant NEON project documents are available at NEON's document archive, including science design documents, the Integrated Science and Education Plan (ISEP) and the Networking and Informatics Baseline Design (NIBD).

External links
 NEON official website
 6 minute overview video about NEON
 Report in the journal Nature on NEON status and planning. (purchase required)
 Free summary of the above Nature report.
 Neon: Addressing the Nation's Environmental Challenges by the Board of Life Sciences of the National Academy of Sciences, published 2003

Ecological data
Environmental monitoring
Ecology organizations
Observatories